Adélabú is a name of Yoruba origin, meaning "the crown or royalty appears over large distances".

Notable people with the name include:
 Adebayo Adelabu (born 1970), Deputy governor, operations of the Central Bank of Nigeria and Oyo State gubernatorial candidate.
 Adegoke Adelabu (born 1915), Nigerian politician
 Abu-Abdullah Adelabu (born 1964), Nigerian academic